Franz Csandl (born 24 September 1948) is an Austrian boxer. He competed in the men's light middleweight event at the 1972 Summer Olympics.

References

1948 births
Living people
Austrian male boxers
Olympic boxers of Austria
Boxers at the 1972 Summer Olympics
Place of birth missing (living people)
Light-middleweight boxers